Hidalgo Contreras Covarrubias (born 27 December 1969) is a Mexican politician affiliated with the National Action Party. As of 2014 he served as Deputy of the LIX Legislature of the Mexican Congress representing Baja California.

References

1969 births
Living people
Politicians from Baja California
National Action Party (Mexico) politicians
Autonomous University of Baja California alumni
Academic staff of the Autonomous University of Baja California
21st-century Mexican politicians
Deputies of the LIX Legislature of Mexico
Members of the Chamber of Deputies (Mexico) for Baja California